Phragmataecia roborowskii is a species of moth of the family Cossidae. It is found in north-western China and southern Mongolia.

References

Moths described in 1897
Phragmataecia